Oleksandriia is a city in the Kirovohrad Oblast region in central Ukraine.

Oleksandriia may also refer to:

 Oleksandriia Raion, a district of Kirovohrad Oblast in central Ukraine centred on Oleksandriia
 Oleksandriia, Rivne Oblast, a small village in Rivne Raion, Rivne Oblast, Ukraine

See also
Alexandria (disambiguation)